Lightvessel No.11 was a lightvessel that was in service in the Irish Sea from 1951 to 1988. She was built in 1951 for Trinity House by Philip & Son Ltd in Dartmouth, England.

She was used as a lightvessel near St Gowans Banks and Morecambe Bay before being retired on 21 October 1988. She was sold to Pounds Marine Services in 1991 for £20,000, arriving in Portsmouth on 16 July 1991. She was later sold to Gus van der Loodt in 1995, who towed her to Rotterdam to convert her to a floating restaurant, opening as Breeveertien in 1999, moored in the Wijnhaven, Rotterdam, except for a brief period in April/May 2009 where she underwent a refit and restoration under new owners. On 1 November 2009  she became the Restaurant Tinto, and in 2014 a "British gastropub", now named "V11" or "Vessel 11", and still in the Wijnhaven.

References 

Lightships of the United Kingdom
1951 ships